Xyroptila caminites is a moth of the family Pterophoridae. It was described by Edward Meyrick in 1907 and is found in Assam, India.

References

Moths described in 1907
caminites
Moths of Asia